Loretta T. McNeil (January 10, 1907 – February 24, 1988) was an American athlete who competed mainly in the 100 metres.

She competed for the United States in the 1928 Summer Olympics held in Amsterdam, Netherlands in the 4 x 100 meters where she won the silver medal with her teammates Mary Washburn, Jessie Cross and Betty Robinson.

References

1907 births
1988 deaths
American female sprinters
Athletes (track and field) at the 1928 Summer Olympics
Olympic silver medalists for the United States in track and field
Medalists at the 1928 Summer Olympics
20th-century American women
20th-century American people
Olympic female sprinters